is a 2022 platform game developed by Sonic Team and published by Sega. As Sonic, the player explores the Starfall Islands to collect the Chaos Emeralds, after Sonic and his friends are separated when falling through a wormhole. Frontiers integrates traditional Sonic the Hedgehog elements—such as platforming, rings, and grind rails—into the series' first open world. While exploring the open world, players can complete challenges, fight robotic enemies, and access "Cyber Space" levels inspired by previous Sonic games.

Following the release of Sonic Forces (2017), Sonic Team began exploring approaches for its next game. Takashi Iizuka, head of Sonic Team, wanted Frontiers to be a model for future titles, as Sonic Adventure had done in 1998. Sonic Team settled on an open-ended design, and focused on adapting Sonic's abilities to an open world. Frontiers was announced in December 2021. 

Sonic Frontiers was released for the Nintendo Switch, PlayStation 4, PlayStation 5, Windows, Xbox One, and Xbox Series X/S on November 8, 2022. It received mixed  reviews from critics, with praise given to the visuals and soundtrack but criticism for some technical issues; the controls and combat divided critics. The game was received more favorably by fans of the series. It was a commercial success, selling over 2.9 million copies by the end of December 2022.

Gameplay

Sonic Frontiers is a 3D platformer and action-adventure game. As Sonic, the player explores the Starfall Islands (which consist of various biomes including flowery fields, forests, ancient ruins, and deserts) to collect the Chaos Emeralds and investigate the islands' relationship to them. Sonic retains his abilities from previous Sonic the Hedgehog games: he runs at high speeds, collects rings, grinds on rails, and homes in on enemies to attack. The player can double jump, sidestep, drop dash, and boost if they have enough energy. New abilities include combat attacks, running alongside walls, and using the Cyloop to create a circle of light around objects and interact with them. The Cyloop can perform different tasks by drawing certain shapes — for example, drawing an infinity symbol or an 8 will allow Sonic to boost indefinitely for a short time. Sonic also gains the ability to temporarily boost indefinitely upon collecting the maximum number of rings.  The player can customize the controls and adjust Sonic's speed, turning, acceleration and sensitivity, among other things. As they progress, they can also upgrade Sonic's speed, attack, defense and ring capacity.

The Starfall Islands act as the series's first open world, which writers compared to The Legend of Zelda: Breath of the Wild. The world retains traditional Sonic elements, such as springs, boost pads, and grind rails. The player explores the islands as they scale towers in platforming challenges to reveal parts of the map and solve puzzles, such as orienting statues and speedrunning, to obtain items. One of Sonic's objectives is to rescue three of his friends — Miles "Tails" Prower, Amy Rose, and Knuckles the Echidna — who are trapped in Cyber Space. Tails and Amy initially accompany Sonic in his investigation, while Knuckles was transported there earlier from the ruins above Angel Island.  This is accomplished by obtaining various collectibles found in the open world. Collectibles include Kocos, which upgrade Sonic's moveset, and Memory Tokens, which are used to trigger cutscenes and conversations with Sonic's friends when they receive them. These either progress the story's plot (occasionally via minigames) or expand their relationships with Sonic by requesting the player to complete side quests. Sonic's friends project themselves as holograms in the real world while trapped, allowing them to interact with and advise Sonic.  

The player battles robots throughout the islands, all in various forms; Sonic can dodge and parry attacks and use the Cyloop to make enemies easier to strike. Defeating enemies grants the player experience points that allow the player to purchase additional moves and abilities in combat and the open world. Alongside regular, small enemies, the player battles large "Guardian" bosses. Defeating a Guardian rewards the player with portal gears that, when placed in a portal, allow them to enter Cyber Space. 

Each of the 30 Cyber Space levels, which shift between third-person and side-scrolling perspectives, contains three optional objectives, including time attack, collecting rings, and collecting five red rings; completing each objective rewards players with a key required to collect a Chaos Emerald. Big the Cat makes an appearance as a host for a fishing minigame which is included in set areas of the maps, where Sonic can exchange purple coins found in the overworld to catch fish and other objects that net him fishing tokens based on catch quality. The tokens can then be redeemed for items and collectibles. Collecting all seven Chaos Emeralds allows the player to transform into Super Sonic, which is required to battle and defeat the game's major bosses, the Titans.

Plot

Doctor Eggman travels to the abandoned Starfall Islands to steal the technological secrets created by the Ancients, creatures related to Chaos. When he uploads his artificial intelligence unit, Sage, into a portal, several robotic defense units are summoned. Detecting a threat signature, Sage ceases hijacking the portal and initiates a protection protocol, dragging Eggman into an artificial dimension called Cyber Space.

Sonic, Tails and Amy investigate activity that has drawn the Chaos Emeralds to the islands, but their plane is sucked into a wormhole to Cyber Space. Sonic escapes to the islands in the real world, where a disembodied voice tasks him with finding the emeralds and destroying the island's robotic Titans to remove the boundary between the real and digital worlds. Believing this will save his friends – including Knuckles, who had been transported there while exploring the ruins above Angel Island – Sonic releases their digital forms from cages created by Sage, who works to free Eggman from Cyber Space; destroying the cages causes Sonic's body to become increasingly corrupted. Sage cautions Sonic to leave, influencing the islands' mechanical guardians and Titans to attack him, but grows to sympathize with him while observing his interactions with his friends, and forms a mutual bond with Eggman.

Sonic and his friends learn about the history of the Ancients, who are revealed to be an extraterrestrial race whose planet was destroyed by The End, an all-powerful entity. The Ancients used the Chaos Emeralds to escape and were drawn to the Master Emerald on Earth, but The End followed and started to wipe out their new civilization. The Ancients built the Titans to seal it within Cyber Space, with their essences remaining within their accessories, the Koco, which become inert once Sonic and his friends help them fulfill their final desires in life.

After destroying three of the Titans and disabling the towers that maintain the spatial boundary, Sonic succumbs to his corruption and is trapped between dimensions. Released along with his friends and Eggman, Sonic's guide reveals itself to be The End, which attacks Earth using the last Titan, Supreme. Sonic's friends purge the corruption from him by sacrificing their physical forms, while a reluctant Eggman and Sage help him collect the scattered Chaos Emeralds, which he uses to defeat Supreme. When The End flees into space, Sage takes control of the Titan and assists Sonic in confronting The End's true form, sacrificing herself to destroy it. Sonic's friends are restored and leave the islands with him, now wishing to make a difference in their lives after their new experience, while Eggman remains behind and revives Sage using the island's technology.

Development

Conception
Following the release of Sonic Forces (2017), Sonic Team began exploring approaches for its next Sonic the Hedgehog game. In addition to celebrating the series' upcoming 30th anniversary, the developers sought to define what a modern Sonic game should be and solidify the series' direction for the next decade. Iizuka felt the series needed to take an innovative direction that would lay the foundation for future games, similar to how Sonic the Hedgehog (1991) and Sonic Adventure (1998) set templates used by later games. Forces received criticism for its short length and level design, so its director, Morio Kishimoto, concluded that the team's method of designing levels originating from Sonic Unleashed (2008) would no longer satisfy fans. Sonic Team ultimately determined that the series' traditional linear design contained "little room for evolution" and felt it could not progress in this direction. In particular, Takashi Iizuka, the head of the development team and the producer of the Sonic series, felt 3D Sonic games were not giving players enough freedom and constrained them to linear paths.

The idea to make an open-world Sonic game came from Kishimoto, who enjoyed watching the evolution of the platform genre's world map concept since it was popularized by Super Mario Bros. 3 in 1988. Some Sonic games, such as Sonic Adventure, featured world maps, but Kishimoto felt his idea evolved the concept by combining it with the gameplay. He thought it would allow for more freedom and diverse gameplay.

Kishimoto returned to direct Frontiers, while Sonic Unleashed (2008), Generations (2011), and Forces art director Sachiko Kawamura produced it. Frontiers development lasted five years, longer than previous Sonic games' development cycles. Iizuka attributed the length partly to Frontiers not building on previous Sonic gameplay. Determining the game's direction required trial-and-error, and development restarted from scratch at one point. Sonic Team began holding external playtesting during Frontiers development. The COVID-19 pandemic began during production, requiring Sonic Team to shift to remote work for the first time in its history. Iizuka noted that this made it difficult for developers to "get a sense of the big picture", but the benefit of digital communication "accelerated" other aspects of development.

Design
The designers focused on transitioning Sonic's speed and abilities to an open-world design while remaining true to previous games, and opted for a mysterious tone to reflect Sonic exploring an unfamiliar landscape. Iizuka felt Sonic essence as a 3D action game separated Frontiers from adventure and role-playing games such as the Legend of Zelda series. Kishimoto prefers to describe Frontiers as "open zone" to "open world" as it refers specifically to a freely explorable field in a Sonic game, as to a broader term that can apply to any type of game. In designing Frontiers, Sonic Team drew upon their experiences developing the hub worlds of Sonic Adventure and repeatedly tested how fast Sonic could race through the open world to determine how large it needed to be. Iizuka said the largest challenge was ensuring that fast-paced exploration would be fun. Sonic Team chose not to raise the difficulty level as the game progresses since the open world would provide plenty of content.

Sonic Team decided to prioritize combat to a greater extent, but despite the shift to open-world design, Sonic Team determined that Frontiers did not feel like a Sonic game without platforming elements. This presented the challenge of balancing platforming with exploration; Sonic Team's solution was to have the world open up as a reward for completing challenges. The developers wanted to ensure that players could choose between combat and platforming and would not be forced to fight enemies, so they included various methods to collect items outside platforming and combat, such as puzzles. The 2020 Sonic the Hedgehog feature film influenced the development; Kishimoto requested that Sonic Team incorporate Easter eggs referencing it and based the combat on the film's depiction of Sonic. With the Cyber Space levels, Kishimoto wanted Sonic to "once again... stand amongst the other 'stage-clear' action games" that he enjoyed, like the Sega Genesis-era Sonic games and the Super Mario, Donkey Kong, and Kirby series.

Writing
Ian Flynn, who wrote Sonic the Hedgehog comics published by Archie Comics and IDW Publishing and episodes of the Sonic Boom TV series, wrote the script. Iizuka asked Flynn to write Frontiers after reading his work on the IDW comics. He felt Flynn understood the Sonic cast and would bring "a great improvement to the characters' emotions and dialogue". Iizuka noted that the story differs from previous Sonic games in that it is less humorous and does not make the player's goal obvious, instead challenging them to figure out how to solve problems themselves.

Whereas Flynn had pitched his previous Sonic stories himself, Sega dictated Frontiers premise and which characters Flynn was allowed to use. Flynn considered it "a dream come true" to write a major Sonic game, and he was able to present ideas for using more characters to Sonic Team. Kishimoto said this created a "cooperative back and forth". Given the nonlinear approach, Flynn found pacing the story was "the biggest question" and "had to be massaged and revised as the game's structure took shape". Kishimoto did the Japanese localization using Flynn's script as a base, making changes to suit the Japanese market.

Music

Tomoya Ohtani was the lead composer and sound director for Frontiers. In accordance with the tone, the Frontiers soundtrack is less upbeat and is "focused more on helping to create a mysterious feeling surrounding the islands". Ohtani composed the main theme, "I'm Here", with vocals and lyrics by Merry Kirk-Holmes. The song plays during the battle against Supreme, with the vocal track playing in its second phase. Sleeping with Sirens vocalist Kellin Quinn appears on the prior Titan battle themes; "Undefeatable" (Giganto), "Break Through It All" (Wyvern) and "Find Your Flame" (Knight), and vocalist and producer Tyler Smyth of DangerKids features on the latter track. Japanese rock band One Ok Rock wrote and performed one of the three ending themes, "Vandalize", which also appears on their tenth studio album Luxury Disease. The other two ending themes are "Dear Father" and "One Way Dream", performed by Quinn Barnitt and Nathan Sharp respectively. Additional music for the game was written by Kenichi Tokoi, Takahito Eguchi, Rintaro Soma, Kenji Mizuno, Kanon Oguni, and Hiroshi Kawaguchi. The soundtrack album, Stillness & Motion, was released on December 7, 2022. It features 150 tracks spanning 6 hours and 37 minutes, making it the longest in the series. The soundtrack album debuted in the top 10 for the US Spotify chart a week after it was released.

Marketing and release
Sega planned to release Sonic Frontiers in 2021 to coincide with the franchise's 30th anniversary but delayed it by one year for quality control. Frontiers finished development on October 22, 2022, and released on November 8, 2022, for the Nintendo Switch, PlayStation 4, PlayStation 5, Windows, Xbox One, and Xbox Series X/S.

Sega unveiled a teaser trailer, featuring Sonic running through a forest, at the end of a 30th-anniversary livestream on May 27, 2021. The title was not announced, but the trailer metadata and a Sega press release included the title Sonic Rangers. Iizuka later said that he felt the game was teased prematurely, but believed it necessary given that it was the series's 30th anniversary and that Sonic Team had not announced a game since Forces. Sega trademarked the name Sonic Frontiers in November 2021 and announced it the following month at the Game Awards 2021 in December.

Sega collaborated with video game news website IGN to promote Frontiers throughout June 2022. A trailer featured during the opening night of Gamescom on August 23, 2022. In Japan, the game offered DLC in collaboration with VTuber Inugami Korone, available by pre-ordering the game. Additional information serving as a prelude to Frontiers was sold as pre-release promotional material, titled Sonic Frontiers Prologue. These included an eight-page comic, Sonic Frontiers Prologue: Convergence, released in October 2022, and an accompanying animated short, Sonic Frontiers Prologue: Divergence, released on November 1. The comic was drawn by Evan Stanley, an artist and writer on IDW's Sonic comic series, while animation was directed by Tyson Hesse; both were written by Flynn.

Sonic Frontiers sold in physical and digital versions, offering in-game items as pre-order bonuses, as well as a Digital Deluxe edition, which includes additional items, a digital artbook and a mini digital soundtrack covering Kronos Island. Signing up for the official newsletter before January 31, 2023, gave players a free DLC code to unlock Sonic's Soap shoes from Sonic Adventure 2 (2001). Frontiers received a free DLC pack on November 14, 2022, that included additional cosmetics inspired by Capcom's Monster Hunter series as well as a cooking minigame. Updates for the game, scheduled for release during 2023, include a photo mode, new challenges, additional playable characters and story content.

Some retailers sold copies of Sonic Frontiers before the street date, and the Nintendo Switch version was uploaded online. The composer, Tomoya Ohtani, said he was saddened by the leaks and urged players to not spoil the game.

Reception

Pre-release 
Nintendo Life characterized early Frontiers gameplay footage as divisive. Kotaku felt the game looked fine but derivative and bland, lacking the series' unique identity, and Polygon and Nintendo Life found the open world desolate. Some fans demanded the game be delayed, and the hashtag #DelaySonicFrontiers briefly trended on Twitter. Iizuka said that Sonic Team expected early reactions to be polarized, as he felt the early footage would not give fans a good idea of what to expect.

Post-release

According to the review aggregate website Metacritic, the PlayStation 4 version and Windows version of Sonic Frontiers received "generally favorable reviews", while other console versions received "mixed or average reviews".

Video Games Chronicles felt that the controls had been tightened up, but still occasionally had issues. Destructoid praised the amount of control the player has over Sonic, allowing them to go anywhere they can see. Game Informer praised that Sonic controls "remarkably well" in the open environment. Nintendo Life found the controls to be "hit-and-miss", and Push Square remarked that the game occasionally took control away from the player.

The combat similarly received a mixed reception. Digital Trends and Game Informer described the combat as enjoyable, with Game Informer describing it as "comprehensive". However, Digital Trends criticized its presentation in major boss fights. GameSpot felt the combat was simplistic while providing a diverse range of enemy variety. IGN criticized the combat in Frontiers for being repetitive and unengaging, explaining that the battles against faceless robotic enemies detracted from the fast-paced platforming gameplay.

Video Games Chronicles praised the game as the most "visually and aurally impressive" Sonic game to date, and Shacknews described the visuals of Frontiers as "stunning". IGN and VentureBeat pointed out issues with technical limitations causing large objects to pop into view, disrupting immersion and diminishing the overall polish of the game.

The soundtrack received positive responses. Push Square stated that Frontiers may have "the best soundtrack in the series", praising its lo-fi and rock themes. Writing for Game Informer, Brian Shea praised the music and felt that it contributed to some memorable moments in the game. GameSpot described the music as calming and solemn, comparing it to Breath of the Wild. Shacknews described the soundtrack as "phenomenal", with the boss battle music being a standout.

Sonic Frontiers was well received by Sonic fans. The Washington Post wrote that many enjoyed its controls, emphasis on freedom, story, references to prior Sonic games, and soundtrack. Sonic Frontiers set the record for the largest number of concurrent players for a Sonic game on Steam, surpassing the record held by Sonic Mania. The game was nominated in the Players' Voice category at The Game Awards 2022.

Sales
The Nintendo Switch version of Sonic Frontiers was the fourth best-selling retail game during its first week of release in Japan, with 26,067 physical copies being sold. The PlayStation 5 version was the seventh best-selling retail game in the country throughout the same week, selling 11,111 physical copies. The PlayStation 4 version sold 9,098 physical copies and was the eighth best-selling retail game of the week in Japan, totaling 46,276 copies and outselling God of War Ragnarök. In the United States, Sonic Frontiers was the fourth best-selling game of November overall. On December 12, 2022, Sega announced that Frontiers had sold over 2.5 million copies worldwide, and over 2.9 million copies by December 31.

Notes

References

External links

 

2022 video games
3D platform games
Action-adventure games
Nintendo Switch games
Open-world video games
Platform games
PlayStation 4 games
PlayStation 5 games
Xbox One games
Xbox Series X and Series S games
Sonic Team games
Sonic the Hedgehog video games
Video games developed in Japan
Video games set on fictional islands
Windows games
Video games scored by Tomoya Ohtani
Video games about alien visitations